Ramat Aviv Alef or Ramat Aviv HaYeruka, and originally plainly Ramat Aviv (lit. Spring Heights), is a  neighborhood in northwest Tel Aviv, Israel.

History

Ramat Aviv was founded in 1950s following the great influx of immigrants from Eastern Europe. Golda Meir lived in the neighborhood from 1959 to 1978.

In January 2011 it was published that remains of a building, believed to be 7,800–8,400 years old, were discovered in an archaeological excavation carried out in 8 Fichman Street in Ramat Aviv, by the Israel Antiquities Authority. The findings attest to permanent habitation on the northern bank of the Yarkon River.

Streets, boundaries, and transit
Ramat Aviv is bordered by Einstein Street in the north, Chaim Levanon Street to the east and south, and Namir Road in the west. The main streets in the neighborhood are Brodetzki and Reading. These five arterials are served by several bus lines each.

Landmarks
In the neighborhood are the Alliance High School and Ramat Aviv Mall. In the northeast of the neighborhood, opposite university campus, are student dorms of Tel Aviv University.

Nearby landmarks are Tel Aviv University, the Eretz Israel Museum, the Palmach Museum, and Beth Hatefutsoth.

Other neighborhoods of Tel Aviv with Ramat Aviv in the name
 Ramat Aviv Gimel – to the north of Neve Avivim.
 Ramat Aviv HaHadasha (New Ramat Aviv) – to the west of Neve Avivim

References

Neighborhoods of Tel Aviv